Ilkeät sisarpuolet (Finnish: The Evil Half Sisters) is a 2007 historical novel by Finnish author Kaari Utrio. The novel is set on the coastal cities of Finland in the 1820s.

References

External links
 

Novels by Kaari Utrio
Tammi (company) books
2007 novels
21st-century Finnish novels
Finnish historical novels
Novels set in the 1820s